Maiwala (Kurdish:میوله) or Farokhshad is a mountain of the Zagros Mountains, located in western Iran, north of the city of Kermanshah. It is one of the mountains of Paraw range, with an altitude of 2445 above sea level. It is about 5 km long from the Tang-e Malavard at west to Taq-e Kenesht at east. The mountain is contained several caves of which some are archaeological.

Archaeology 
Archaeologists have discovered artifacts of the Paleolithic and historical periods on the southern slopes of the mountain. Three caves were occupied by Neanderthals during the Middle Paleolithic Period including Do-Ashkaft Cave, Malaverd, and Dasht-e Kahou. Archaeological excavations have shown that about forty thousand years ago, Neanderthal humans used natural outcrops of radiolarite or chert around this plain to make stone tools.

Climbing routes
There are several routes to climb the peak, the most common of which is called the Sine Sorkh. This route starts from the parking lot above the Kouhestan park located in the west of Taq-e Bostan and reaches the Gav-Chal plain through Pa-Koob route from the foothills of Sineh Sorkh. Then from there it continues to the left ridge and reaches the valley of Niyat. Amoo-Salim Cave, which is hand-carved, is located at the top of this valley. It is fifteen minutes away from this cave to the summit.

Notes 

Zagros Mountains
Mountains of Kermanshah Province
Two-thousanders of Iran
Mountains of Iran